Short Circuit is the first ever Gujarati science fiction film based on the concept of time loop. It is directed by Faisal Hashmi and was released in 2019. The film is written by Faisal Hashmi, Bhargav Purohit and Mohsin Chavada, produced by Twilight Productions and features Dhvanit Thaker and Kinjal Rajpriya in the lead roles, while Smit Pandya and Utkarsh Mazumdar in supporting roles. Short Circuit received generally positive review from critics upon its release and praised for its direction, plot, VFX and performances. Short Circuit had a successful run at the box office.

Plot
Samay (Dhvanit Thaker) works for an IT company and has a job repairing computers. His mother always nags him to marry soon. Samay falls in love with Seema (Kinjal Rajpriya), who is a news anchor at Zee 24 Kalak. She interviews a scientist, Dr. Parthsarthi (Utkarsh Mazumdar), who is doing some experiments on creating a portable wormhole inside his lab. During the interview, Parthsarthi gets angry and threatens to kill Seema if she gets in his way. 
Samay is planning to propose Seema. But, while coming out of the building, a masked man shoots Seema and she dies on the spot. That night, Samay gets drunk with his friend, Bhopa (Smit Pandya) and both of them see Aurora Borealis in the sky. It's a strange event because Aurora never happens in India. Samay goes to bed and sleeps. 
From the next day, he starts to live the same day again and again. How he saves Seema and how he uncovers the mystery behind the time loop is rest of the film.

Cast

 Dhvanit Thaker as Samay.
 Kinjal Rajpriya as Seema.
 Smit Pandya as Bhopo.
 Utkarsh Mazumdar as Dr. Parthsarthi.
 Vikee Shah as Jacob
 Ragi Jani as Raju Don
 Anshu Joshi as Security Guard

Production 
The writing of the film started in August 2017 after director Faisal Hashmi finished his second film Daud Pakad.

Director Faisal Hashmi revealed that the film uses an extensive amount of VFX and it contains around 1,132 VFX shots.

The writers took inspiration from various time loop films.

The script demanded a lab where a secret experiment to create a portable wormhole is taking place. The producers hired NID students to create the lab as per the director's instruction. The set was erected at GMDC ground in Ahmedabad. This was the only set built for the film.

The director hired sound designer Udit Duseja for the sound design. The sound mixing was done at AM Studio, Chennai.

Marketing and release 
The teaser was released on 14 December 2018 while the trailer was released on 26 December 2018. Both were well received. Later a promotional song "Samay" was released on 4 January 2019.

Soundtrack

Promotional song was composed by Kedar & Bhargav.

Release
The film was released on 11 January 2019.

Reception
The film received very positive response from audience for its narrative, direction and VFX. Shruti Jambhekar of The Times of India rated the film 3.5 out of 5, praising its direction, VFX, story line, editing and performances. She said; "We have to give it to the production house, director Faisal Hashmi and the entire team for attempting a sci-fi thriller in Gujarati. Considering it’s the first time this genre has been attempted, it’s a pretty decent effort-good VFX, a grand set-up and an interesting (although predictable) story line. Faisal Hashmi deserves a pat on the back for showing considerable improvement as a filmmaker in his second movie." Jayesh Adhyaru rated it 3 out of 5 praising direction, VFX and performances. He noted similarities with 1993 Hollywood film 12:01 and praised for giving credit to it. Divya Bhaskar rated it 3 out of 5 as a decent entertainer praising its direction, storyline, editing and VFX. Badhir Amdavadi rated it 4 out of 5, saying, "It's a complete family entertainer which keeps you hooked till climax."

Accolades

References

External links
 

2019 films
Films set in Ahmedabad
Films shot in Ahmedabad
Films shot in Gujarat
2010s science fiction adventure films
2010s science fiction comedy films
Indian science fiction comedy films
Time loop films
2010s Gujarati-language films
2019 comedy films